Francis West (28 October 1586 – February 1633/1634) was a Deputy Governor of the Colony and Dominion of Virginia.

Early and family life
Born in Salisbury, Wiltshire on 28 October 1586, West was one of four sons of Thomas West, 2nd Baron De La Warr (1556–1602) of Wherwell Abbey in Hampshire and his wife, Anne Knollys who made their fortunes in the Virginia colony. His elder brother, Thomas West, 3rd Baron De La Warr (1577–1618), served as a governor of the Virginia Company of London from 1610–1611. His younger brother, John West (1590-ca 1659), served as Acting Governor of Virginia from 1635–1637. A fourth brother, Nathaniel West, died in Virginia in August 1623, aged 30.

Career
Francis West was one of the distinguished passengers on Captain Christopher Newport's third voyage to  Jamestown, Virginia, which arrived in the summer of 1609; Newport returned to London with a load of iron ore sold to the East India Company. Francis West was selected to the Governor's Council in 1609, and remained such for the rest of his life, although he returned to England many times and the colony's private charter was superseded by a royal charter in 1624 (two years after attacks by native Americans killed many settlers).

Meanwhile, West returned to Jamestown on the Mary Ann Margett in 1610. The new colony had been suffering from lack of provisions, and the colonists elected West as their "President" in the absence of Sir Thomas Gates or other high official of the London Company, although the following year they elected George Pearcy to that position. From 1612 to 1617 West was the Commandant of Jamestown. From July 30 through August 4, 1619, based on his position on the Governor's Council, West served in what would later become the upper house of the Virginia General Assembly, although he was not listed as one of the elected burgesses in Jamestown's first Legislative Assembly.

In 1622 Captain West was appointed Admiral to New England, where he served alongside Capt. Christopher Levett, Governor of Plymouth, on a three-man council under Capt. Robert Gorges, named Governor General of the Plymouth Council for New England's venture in Massachusetts. West subsequently served as Deputy Governor of Virginia from 17 November 1627 to 5 March 1629. He also served as Captain General of Virginia.

Personal life

West married three times. His first wife, Margaret Whitney, whom he married circa 16?5, was a three-time widow lastly married to Edward Blayney, and who died within two years. In March 1627 West remarried, to the widow of Governor George Yeardley, Temperance Flowerdew. She died in December of the same year, and West unsuccessfully litigated against the former Governor's orphaned children for possession of her estate. He married thirdly Jane Davye. He had one son, Francis West in 16??. In 1632, his estate was in Elizabeth Citie, south of the land of James Knott.

Death and legacy
According to some records, he died in February 1633/1634, although this is not certain. However, two years later, fellow colonists "thrusting out" royal governor Governor Sir John Harvey selected his brother, John West, who had previously served as a burgess, as the temporary replacement.

Ancestry

References

Sources
Nugent, Nell Marion; Cavaliers and Pioneers: Abstracts of Virginia Land Patents and Grants. Vol. 1. 1623–1666. Virginia State Library and Archives, Richmond, Virginia 1936
Powhatan's Mantle: Indians in the Colonial Southeast by Peter H. Wood.

External links 
 http://www.nps.gov/archive/colo/Jthanout/RepAssem.html
 Temperence Flowerdew 

1586 births
1634 deaths
Colonial governors of Virginia
People from Test Valley
House of Burgesses members
Younger sons of barons
Francis West
English emigrants
People from Salisbury
People from Jamestown, Virginia